Parliamentary Road was a major street in the Townhead area of the city of Glasgow, Scotland.

The road was the original north eastern continuation of Sauchiehall Street, crossing the railway tracks of Queen Street Station and on into the Townhead area of the East End. It was originally constructed at a cost of £6,000 and was a toll road until 1865. 

The Glasgow Lunatic Asylum was located on Parliamentary Road between 1814 and 1843, when it moved to new premises at Gartnavel Royal Hospital.

However, a combination of slum clearance and the subsequent construction of the Townhead B housing estate in the 1960s, and later; the construction of Buchanan Street Bus Station in the late 1970s saw a complete rearrangement of the roads in the area.  The western section of the road was realigned in an approximate east–west axis between North Hanover Street and West Nile Street and was renamed as Killermont Street (the original Killermont Street having been a continuation of West Nile Street, running north–south), whilst the eastern section disappeared in the 1960s during the slum clearance efforts of the period, and their replacement under a major council house redevelopment. A path running north easterly through the housing estate follows the approximate line of the route.

The final remains of Parliamentary Road were removed in the 1990s when the construction of the Glasgow Royal Concert Hall and the Buchanan Galleries shopping mall over the western end of the road took place, and an eastern stub disappeared under a five-a-side football complex.

References

Streets in Glasgow
Former roads
History of Glasgow